Edward Doherty may refer to:

 Eddie Doherty (1890–1975), reporter, author, screenwriter and priest
 Edward P. Doherty (1838–1897), Irish-Canadian officer, led the soldiers who captured and killed Lincoln's assassin
 Ed Doherty (American football) (1918–2000), American football player and coach
 Ed Doherty (baseball executive) (1900–1971), American baseball executive
 Ed Doherty (politician) (born 1949), Canadian politician